Dictyonema is a genus of dendroid graptolites in the order Dendroidea.

Fossil record
Fossils of Dictyonema are found from the Upper Cambrian to the Devonian (age range: from 488.3 to 383.7 million years ago.). They are known from various localities in Europe, North America, South America, China and Morocco.

Description
These colonial organism are characterized by a conical, net-like structure. The colonies (known as rhabdosomes) are branched and may vary from almost discoidal to almost cylindrical. They were stationary planktonic suspension feeders.

Species
†Dictyonema macgillivrayi (Hall 1899)
†Dictyonema pulchellum (Hall 1899)
†Dictyonema retiforme (Hall 1843)

Bibliography
Bulman, O. M. B. 1970. Graptolithina with sections of Enteropneusta and Pterobranchia. In Treatise on Invertebrate Paleontology Part V 2nd ed. (C. Teichert, ed.) pp. V1-V149. The Geological Society of America, Inc.: Boulder (Colorado), and the University of Kansas: Lawrence (Kansas).
Fletcher, H. O. 1971. Catalogue of type specimens of fossils in the Australian Museum, Sydney. Australian Museum Memoir 13: 1-167.
Jaanusson, V. 1979. Ordovician. In: Robison, R. A., & C. Teichert (eds) Treatise on Invertebrate Paleontology pt A. Introduction. Fossilisation (Taphonomy), Biogeography and Biostratigraphy pp. A136-A166. The Geological Society of America, Inc.: Boulder (Colorado), and The University of Kansas: Lawrence (Kansas).
Kozłowski, R. 1948. Les graptolithes et quelques nouveaux groupes d’animaux du Tremadoc de la Pologne. Palaeontologica Polonica 3: I-XII, 1-235.
Rudolf Ruedemann - Graptolites of North America – Geological Society of America

References

Silurian animals of North America
Dendroidea
Graptolite genera
Paleozoic life of Ontario
Paleozoic life of New Brunswick
Paleozoic life of Newfoundland and Labrador
Paleozoic life of the Northwest Territories